Akgün Kaçmaz (February 19, 1935) is a Turkish football defender who played for Turkey in the 1954 FIFA World Cup. He also played for Fenerbahçe S.K. between 1951–61.

References

External links
 
 

1935 births
Turkish footballers
Turkey international footballers
Association football defenders
Fenerbahçe S.K. footballers
1954 FIFA World Cup players
Living people
Turkey youth international footballers